Tugarinskaya is a rural locality (a village) in Vinogradovsky District, Arkhangelsk Oblast, Russia. The population was 11 as of 2010.

Geography 
Tugarinskaya is located 64 km southeast of Bereznik (the district's administrative centre) by road. Nizhnyaya Topsa is the nearest rural locality.

References 

Rural localities in Vinogradovsky District